"Toy Soldiers" is a song by American singer-songwriter Martika, appearing on her eponymous debut album (1988) and released in the United States as the second single from the album on April 26, 1989. It was a number-one Billboard Hot 100 hit for two weeks in mid-1989. An edited version of the song is included in the imported version of the album Toy Soldiers: The Best of Martika. Its music video was directed by Jim Shea.

Background
Martika wrote the song about a friend who was battling a cocaine addiction. "I was a little hesitant because I had only written two songs before and they were light songs. I came up to Michael and said I wanted to write about drugs. It was the first time I got the nerve to write about something that was scary for me to talk about, so I did." According to an episode of VH-1's Pop-Up Video, in which "Toy Soldiers" was featured, the friend-in-question eventually conquered the addiction.

Composition
The song is performed in the key of C minor with a tempo of 65 beats per minute in  time.  The song follows a chord progression of A–B–A–B–Cm–B–Cm–Gm–Cm–B.

Chart performance
The song spent two weeks at number one on the US Billboard Hot 100 and in New Zealand while peaking within the top ten of the charts in both Australia and the United Kingdom. On Billboards year-end chart for 1989, "Toy Soldiers" placed number 29. It was Martika's only number-one single in the US, and her highest-ranking single in the United Kingdom. The single was certified gold in the United States by the Recording Industry Association of America (RIAA).

In March and April 2009, VH1 ran a countdown of the 100 Greatest One-Hit Wonders of the 80s. "Toy Soldiers" placed at number 67 on the countdown, although Martika had three other top 40 hits: "More Than You Know" (number 18); "I Feel the Earth Move" (number 25); and "Love... Thy Will Be Done" (number 10).

Critical reception
Bryan Buss of AllMusic retrospectively reviewed the Martika album, stating "the big hit single, 'Toy Soldiers', works with its childlike vocals and lyrics, creating a haunting, effective dichotomy with its subject of drug addiction." Buss also highlighted the song as an album standout by labeling it an AMG Pick Track. Another editor, Rob Theakston, labeled the song as an AMG Pick Track on the 2005 compilation Toy Soldiers: The Best of Martika. Harriet Dell from Smash Hits wrote, "It's a lovely song nevertheless, with a catchy nursery rhyme chorus sung by lots of cissy voiced kids".

Music video
The accompanying music video for the song was directed by Jim Shea, who later became a regular in directing country music videos. Martika is seen singing with a waterfall in front of her (this was done by filming her in an empty pool with a water current flowing between her and the camera).

Track listings
 7-inch single
 "Toy Soldiers" – 4:52
 "Exchange of Hearts" – 4:15

 3-inch single
 "Toy Soldiers" – 4:52
 "Exchange of Hearts" – 4:15
 "It's Not What You're Doing" – 4:11

 12-inch single
 "Toy Soldiers" – 4:52
 "It's Not What You're Doing" – 4:11
 "Exchange of Hearts" – 4:15

Charts

Weekly charts

Year-end charts

Certifications

Release history

Cover versions and sampling

 Martika recorded and produced a Spanish version of "Toy Soldiers" renaming it "Como Un Juguete", though it was not as successful as the original English version. She also recorded the song in Japanese.
 Eminem's 2005 single "Like Toy Soldiers" features samples from "Toy Soldiers". A sample of Martika's singing the chorus is used as the chorus of the Eminem version. The subject of the Eminem song is markedly different from the Martika song, concerning violence and murder linked to rap music rather than drug addiction. The sample is played faster than the original version with an added drum beat. The final chorus of Martika's song is used as the chorus of Eminem's version.
 My Vitriol covered the song for their 2007 EP A Pyrrhic Victory.
 Silversun Pickups covered the song for a 2020 7" single titled Toy Soldiers.
 Amber Van Day's 2020 single Kids in the Corner features melodic hints from "Toy Soldiers".
 In the 2023 movie M3GAN, the title character, a robot humanoid utilizing advanced artificial intelligence, plays "Toy Soldiers" on the piano before confronting her creator.

See also
 List of Billboard Hot 100 number-one singles of 1989

References

External links
 

1989 singles
1988 songs
Billboard Hot 100 number-one singles
CBS Records singles
Martika songs
Number-one singles in New Zealand
Songs about cocaine
Songs written by Martika
Songs written by Michael Margules